Hippeastrum correiense is a flowering perennial herbaceous bulbous plant, in the family Amaryllidaceae, native to Brazil.

Description 
Large bulbs and trumpet shaped flowers.

Taxonomy 
Described under its current name by Arthington Worsley in The Gardeners' Chronicle (ser. 3, 85: 377) in 1929.

Synonyms:
 Amaryllis correiensis Bury, Select. Hexandr. Pl.: 9 (1832). (Basionym)
 Amaryllis aulica var. glaucophylla Hook., Bot. Mag. 57: t. 2983 (1830).
 Hippeastrum aulicum var. glaucophyllum (Hook.) Herb., Amaryllidaceae: 136 (1837).
 Hippeastrum organense Herb., Bot. Mag. 67: t. 3803 (1840).
 Hippeastrum organense var. compressum Herb., Edwards's Bot. Reg. 28(Misc.): 39 (1842).
 Amaryllis gardneri Seub. in C.F.P.von Martius et auct. suc. (eds.), Fl. Bras. 3(1): 149 (1847).
 Hippeastrum gardneri (Seub.) Hoehne, Araucarilandia: 30 (1930).
 Amaryllis organensis (Herb.) Traub et Uphof, Herbertia 5: 129 (1938).
 Amaryllis organensis var. compressa (Herb.) Traub, Pl. Life 7: 35 (1951).

References

Sources 

 
 GBIF: Hippeastrum correiense
 List of Species of the Brazilian Flora. Rio de Janeiro Botanical Garden  (Search for Hippeastrum correiense)

Flora of South America
correiense
Garden plants of South America